LIV Golf is a professional golf tour financed by the Public Investment Fund, the sovereign wealth fund of Saudi Arabia. The name "LIV" refers to the Roman numerals for 54, the score if every hole on a par-72 course were birdied and the number of holes to be played at LIV events. The first LIV Golf Invitational Series event started on 9 June 2022, at the Centurion Club near London, England. The Invitational Series became the LIV Golf League in 2023.

Journalists and commentators have said the tour is part of efforts by the Saudi monarchy, which has been criticized for its corruption and human rights abuses, to improve its public image through sports.

Organization
 
The early framework for a new golf tour to rival the PGA Tour became public in 2019 with announcement of a league to be known as the Premier Golf League. PGA Tour Commissioner Jay Monahan responded by implying that golfers who choose to play in a new league would be barred from PGA Tour events. Later in 2020, the PGA European Tour and the PGA Tour formed a "strategic alliance" to work together on commercial opportunities, scheduling, and prize funds for each tour's membership.

The Premier Golf League held talks with Saudi investors about a financial partnership, but Golf Saudi (a division of the Public Investment Fund) instead funded a new entity in 2020 which had its own plan to establish a global professional league, often referred to as the "Super Golf League". This entity formally launched in October 2021 as LIV Golf Investments, with former professional golfer Greg Norman named as CEO.

LIV Golf has often been described as the golfing equivalent to the dormant breakaway European Super League in football.

In July 2022, LIV Golf formally applied to be included in the Official World Golf Ranking, a process which typically takes between a year and two years from application submission to approval and awarding of OWGR points. In October 2022, LIV Golf entered into a "strategic alliance" with the MENA Tour; the arrangement was conceived in order to immediately afford LIV Golf events ranking points, however it was subsequently confirmed that events in 2022 would not receive points as changes to the MENA Tour would need to be reviewed.

Format 
The inaugural season of the LIV Golf Invitational Series features eight 54-hole no-cut stroke play tournaments and a final Team Championship, set to be a "seeded four-day, four-round, match play knock-out" event held at Trump National Doral Miami in October 2022.

In June 2022, it was reported that LIV Golf would evolve the following year into a league format with a 14-event schedule and 48 contracted players. On 27 July 2022, Norman announced that LIV Golf would implement a promotion and relegation system, featuring a rankings list and a four-player relegation out of the 48 contracted players. The league has a prize fund of $405 million. Its events are scheduled to avoid competing with PGA Tour majors and international team events.

Broadcasting rights
The 2022 LIV Golf Invitational Series was streamed live on Facebook and YouTube.

In June 2022, LIV Golf signed a worldwide broadcasting deal with video streaming service DAZN. Additional deals were signed the following months, including ServusTV in Germany and Austria, Eleven Sports in Italy, Claro Sports in Latin America, GameTV nationally across Canada and CHCH-TV in Hamilton, Ontario, Canada.

United States 

In January 2023, LIV signed their first national broadcasting deal in the United States with The CW, a broadcast network controlled by Nexstar Media Group. While the network has secured full national distribution for these telecasts, in thirteen media markets—including those where the CW network affiliates are owned by CBS News and Stations (as CBS Sports is a rightsholder of the PGA Tour) or Tegna—the network had to find alternate affiliates to carry the telecasts, including several other Nexstar-owned stations.

Player signups
On 1 June 2022, the field was released for the first event, to be played at the Centurion Club. The list included several major champions and former world number ones: Dustin Johnson, Sergio García, Martin Kaymer, Graeme McDowell, Louis Oosthuizen, Charl Schwartzel and Lee Westwood. One source said Johnson  winner of two major championships and a former World No. 1  was paid US$150 million to play in the LIV series. Johnson, who had won 24 PGA events and $74 million since 2008, announced his resignation from the PGA Tour on 7 June 2022, saying, "I chose what's best for me and my family." Ian Poulter was reportedly offered £22 million (US$30 million) to join the league. Lee Westwood said that he had signed a non-disclosure agreement relating to the topic.

On 4 June 2022, Kevin Na became the first member of the PGA Tour to resign to participate in LIV Golf, saying, "If I exercise my right to choose where and when I play golf, then I cannot remain a PGA Tour player without facing disciplinary proceedings and legal action from the PGA Tour.... I hope the current policies change and I'll be able to play on the PGA Tour again." Reigning U.S. Amateur champion James Piot, who turned professional in May 2022, chose to play in the first LIV Golf tournament without having joined the PGA Tour.

In a Washington Post interview published on 5 June 2022, LIV Golf CEO Greg Norman said that Tiger Woods had declined to join, turning down a deal that was "mind-blowingly enormous; we're talking about high nine digits."

Before the second event in Portland, LIV Golf announced further signings, including several players in the top-50 of the world rankings, and three more major champions: Bryson DeChambeau, Brooks Koepka, and Patrick Reed. During that event, it was announced that Paul Casey would play in the third event in Bedminster. Further signings before Bedminster included European Ryder Cup captain Henrik Stenson, who was removed from the role before the move was announced. In August 2022, before the fourth event in Boston, LIV Golf announced that six more players had joined, including Open champion and world number two Cameron Smith and Chilean world number 19 Joaquín Niemann.

Roster 

 Shergo Al Kurdi
 Abraham Ancer
 Oliver Bekker
 Richard Bland
 Itthipat Buranatanyarat
 Dean Burmester
 Laurie Canter
 Paul Casey
 Eugenio Chacarra
 Ratchanon Chantananuwat (a)
 Bryson DeChambeau
 Hennie du Plessis
 Oliver Fisher
 Sergio García
 Talor Gooch
 Branden Grace
 Justin Harding
 Sam Horsfield
 Charles Howell III
 Yuki Inamori
 Dustin Johnson
 Matt Jones
 Sadom Kaewkanjana
 Martin Kaymer
 Phachara Khongwatmai
 Sihwan Kim
 Ryosuke Kinoshita
 Brooks Koepka
 Chase Koepka
 Jason Kokrak
 Jinichiro Kozuma
 Anirban Lahiri
 Pablo Larrazábal
 Danny Lee
 Marc Leishman
 Viraj Madappa
 Graeme McDowell
 Phil Mickelson
 Jediah Morgan
 Sebastián Muñoz
 Kevin Na
 Joaquín Niemann
 Shaun Norris
 Andy Ogletree
 Louis Oosthuizen
 Wade Ormsby
 Carlos Ortiz
 Adrián Otaegui
 Mito Pereira
 Pat Perez
 Turk Pettit
 Thomas Pieters
 James Piot
 Ian Poulter
 David Puig
 Patrick Reed
 J. C. Ritchie
 Charl Schwartzel
 Cameron Smith
 Travis Smyth
 Ian Snyman
 Brendan Steele
 Henrik Stenson
 Hudson Swafford
 Hideto Tanihara
 Cameron Tringale
 Peter Uihlein
 Harold Varner III
 Scott Vincent
 Bubba Watson
 Lee Westwood
 Bernd Wiesberger
 Blake Windred
 Matthew Wolff
 Kevin Yuan

Reaction
Human rights groups have criticized LIV Golf as sportswashing, a political strategy by Saudi Arabia to cleanse its repressive global image through sport. Human Rights Watch, for example, called the Saudi endeavor "an effort to distract from its serious human rights abuses by taking over events that celebrate human achievement". 

Greg Norman has been accused of aiding the repressive Saudi government for his own financial gain. In 2021, Norman denied that he was being used for sportswashing and said he works for LIV because of his passion for the sport. Later, in May 2022, Norman defended the involvement of Saudi Crown Prince Mohammed bin Salman with Jamal Khashoggi's murder, saying, "Look, we've all made mistakes, and you just want to learn from those mistakes and how you can correct them going forward." His statement drew extensive criticism. Khashoggi's fiancée, Hatice Cengiz, said it was hurtful that "Jamal's brutal killing is brushed off as a 'mistake' and that we should just move on".

On 22 June 2022, a group of nearly 2,500 survivors of family members killed or injured during the September 11 attacks wrote an open letter to golfers who have remained loyal to the PGA Tour thanking them for not defecting to LIV Golf. The letter read in part, "Thank you for standing up for decency. Thank you for standing up for the 9/11 Families. Thank you for resisting the Kingdom of Saudi Arabia's efforts to cleanse its reputation by buying off professional athletes...To those of you who have chosen what is right over blood money from a corrupt, destructive sports entity and its Saudi backers, please continue to stand strong." On 17 July 2022, a group of September 11 victims' family members condemned former U.S. President Donald Trump for hosting the LIV Golf tour at his Trump National Golf Club in Bedminster, New Jersey; the group's letter to Trump noted that he himself had blamed Saudi Arabia for the 9/11 attack during a 2016 interview on Fox News.

Tiger Woods, who turned down an offer of $700 million to $800 million to join LIV Golf, was asked in July 2022 about the golfers who had joined. "I disagree with it. I think that what they've done is they've turned their back on what has allowed them to get to this position," Woods said at a press conference before the 2022 Open Championship. "I know what the PGA Tour stands for and what we have done and what the tour has given us, the ability to chase after our careers and to earn what we get and the trophies we have been able to play for and the history that has been a part of this game."

PGA Tour
The PGA Tour announced that its members who participate in LIV Golf events could be sanctioned for playing in a conflicting event without the Tour's permission, which could result in fines, suspensions, or bans. On 9 June 2022, the PGA Tour announced that its members participating in the first LIV Golf tournament (including current members as well as those who had recently resigned) were no longer eligible to compete in tour events or the Presidents Cup. By contrast, the constitution of the European Tour does not provide for banning players who enter conflicting events.

On 11 July 2022, The Wall Street Journal reported that the United States Department of Justice was investigating the PGA Tour to determine if they have engaged in anti-competitive behavior with LIV Golf.

In September 2022, Sports Illustrated reported that the PGA Tour had sent a letters to Japan Golf Tour members notifying them that the PGA Tour would exclude LIV Golf players from their co-sanctioned events, such as the Zozo Championship, even if they were not members of the PGA Tour. Sports Illustrated speculated that the letters were the reason that all four Japanese players who had played in earlier events had withdrawn from the series prior to the fourth event in Boston, reporting that the letters had been sent to PGA Tour members who had joined LIV Golf but not resigned their membership of the PGA Tour advising them that their membership would "not be renewed for the 2022–23 season".

European Tour

In June 2022, the PGA and European tours announced a strengthening of their "strategic alliance", with the PGA Tour increasing their stake in European Tour Productions to 40% and further changes being made to the European Tour, including increased prize funds and leading players in the DP World Tour Rankings gaining PGA Tour cards for the following season.

The European Tour did not take any disciplinary action until the end of June, when it was announced that LIV Golf participants would be fined and suspended from the European Tour's three PGA Tour co-sanctioned events. Several players, including Ian Poulter, took legal action and the suspensions were put on hold, allowing them to play in the Genesis Scottish Open and subsequent tour events pending a full hearing, which was scheduled by Sport Resolutions UK for February 2023. On 20 June 2022, the tour removed Henrik Stenson as captain of the European Ryder Cup team as a result of his decision to join LIV Golf.

Trademark issues 
In March 2023, LIV Miami—a David Grutman-founded nightclub that is among the highest grossing in the United States—filed a Notice of Opposition seeking to block a U.S. trademark registration by LIV Golf, citing that its marks "are visually, phonetically, and aurally similar and the goods/services share similarities", and that it would "dilute the distinctive quality" of its brand. LIV in Miami opened in 2008, with its name referring to its location—the Fontainebleau Miami Beach hotel—having originally opened in 1954.

LIV Golf seasons

2022 season

On 17 March 2022, the first eight tournament schedule with prize money of $255 million was announced by Greg Norman. The no cut 54-hole tournaments feature 48 players drafted into 12 four-man teams, with shotgun starts. The first seven events have $20 million purses with an additional $5 million split among the top three teams each week; a team championship concludes the schedule with $30 million on offer to the top three players and an additional $50 million in team prizes.

2023 season

The season was renamed as the LIV Golf League for the 2023 season having previously been the LIV Golf Invitational Series. The season is proposed to consist of 14 no cut 54-hole tournaments.

Awards

Notes

References

External links 
 Official site

 
Multi-national professional sports leagues
Professional golf tours
Public Investment Fund
Sports controversies
Sports leagues established in 2022